Pettis may refer to:

People
Pettis (surname)
Pettis Norman, American football tight end

Places
Pettis County, Missouri
Pettis Township, Adair County, Missouri
Pettis Township, Platte County, Missouri